William Henry Poulett, 6th Earl Poulett (22 September 1827 – 22 January 1899) was an English peer, landowner, army officer, and racehorse owner. In the House of Lords he was a Conservative.

Early life
When Poulett was born in 1827, his chance of inheriting the family estates seemed remote. He was the third son of Vice-Admiral the Hon. George Poulett RN (1786–1854), who was the second son of the 4th Earl and the brother of the 5th Earl, who already had three sons. His mother, Catherine Poulett, was a daughter of Sir George Dallas, 1st Baronet.  He joined the 54th (West Norfolk) Regiment of Foot in 1840 and was educated at the Royal Military College, Sandhurst, passing out in 1842. Commissioned into the 54th Regiment, in 1846 he transferred to the 2nd Queen’s Royals, then from 1852 to 1857 was with the 22nd Regiment in India, taking part in the British expedition from Peshawar to the Boroe Valley in 1853, and was with Brigadier-General Boileau at the storming of the heights.

Inheritance
In 1857, news reached Poulett in India that both surviving sons of his uncle the 5th Earl had died: Amias Poulett on 20 February 1857, and Vere Poulett, Viscount Hinton, on 29 August 1857. As Poulett's own father and older brothers had also died, this left him unexpectedly as the heir presumptive to the family estates, and he returned to England. From 1858 to 1870, he hunted the Hambledon Foxhounds six days a week. In 1864, as foreseen, he succeeded his uncle, the 5th Earl Poulett, inheriting Hinton House and about 11,000 acres, mostly around Hinton St George, with a second country house at Granville Hall, Droxford. He became a racehorse owner, specialising in National Hunt, and owned The Lamb, winner of the Grand National in 1868 and 1871. Another of his horses, Benazal, won twenty-seven steeple-chases and other races. In Who's Who, Poulett gave his recreations as "Racing, hunting, steeple-chasing, shooting, driving, yachting, fishing, telegraphy, and photography". He was a member of the Army and Navy Club, Arthur’s, the Wellington Club, the Royal Albert Yacht Club, the Royal London Yacht Club, and others.

Personal life
Poulett married three times. First, on 23 June 1849, Elizabeth Lavinia, daughter of Joseph Newman of Landport, a pilot; she died in 1871.  Elizabeth is listed in Burke's peerage and the Royal Genealogy records Later that year he married, secondly, Emma Sophia Johnson, who died in 1876. Lastly, in 1879, he married Rosa, daughter of Alfred Hugh (de) Melville, an artist, and they had one son, William John Lydston Poulett, Viscount Hinton, born 11 September 1883, and two daughters, Eleanor Augusta Rosa, born 9 October 1879, and Violet Nita, born 5 October 1880.  His daughter Lady Violet married Cecil John Talbot Rhys Wingfield and was the mother of Edward William Rhys Wingfield (1905–1984).

A son, William Turnour Thomas Poulett, had been born to his first wife on 15 December 1849, at Southsea, Hampshire, only six months after their marriage, and Poulett had reason to believe he had been fathered by another man, Captain William Turnour Granville. In 1869, this son had married Lydia Ann Shippey, the daughter of William Shippey, a general dealer. They had one son, William Henry George Poulett (born 1 April 1870), and a daughter, Maud.  In November 1871, W. T. T. Poulett petitioned the Court for Divorce and Matrimonial Causes for a Declaration of Legitimacy, to establish that he was the lawful son of William Henry Poulett, now the 6th Earl. In 1875, he was living at the family's secondary estate, Grenville Hall, Droxford, under the courtesy title of Viscount Hinton. However, after the birth of William John Lydston Poulett in 1883, W. T. T. Poulett was again disowned.

Dispute
Following the 6th Earl's death, the Poulett earldom and its entailed estates were claimed by W. T. T. Poulett, and on 27 July 1903, on a report from its Committee of Privileges, the House of Lords determined the dispute in favour of the 6th Earl's fifteen-year-old son, William John Lydston Poulett.  In a curious turn of events, Wilhelmina Powlett, Duchess of Cleveland, the widow of a distant kinsman of the 6th Earl Poulett, left W. H. G. Poulett a bequest of £5,000 in her will, and he became a tea-planter in Ceylon.

Notes

External links
 ST4112 : Monument to William, 6th Earl Poulett – St George's church, Hinton St George at geograph.org.uk

1827 births
1899 deaths
Graduates of the Royal Military College, Sandhurst
6
William, 6th Earl